Christiane Judith Yvette Minazzoli (11 July 1931 - 2 November 2014) was a French actress. She appeared in more than seventy films from 1949 to 1997.

Selected filmography

References

External links 

1931 births
2014 deaths
French film actresses